Events from the year 1650 in Sweden

Incumbents
 Monarch – Christina

Events

 - Coronation of Queen Christina. 
 - The harvests fail over all Sweden.

Births

 Unknown date - Eva Margareta Frölich, mystic, prophet, visionary and Pietistic writer (died 1692) 
 Lars Ulstadius,  Lutheran minister and a schoolteacher (died 1732)

Deaths

 11 February – René Descartes, French philosopher (born 1596 in France)
 Carl Gyllenhielm, soldier and politician (born 1574)

References

External links

 
Years of the 17th century in Sweden
Sweden